The Trishuli River is one of the major tributaries of the Narayani River basin in central Nepal. The river is formed by the merger of Kyirong Tsangpo and Lende Khola originating in Gyirong County of Tibet,  which join together near the Rasuwa Gadhi on the Nepal–Tibet border. The valley of the river provided the traditional trade route between the Kathmandu Valley and Tibet.

Etymology
The Trishuli is named after the trishula or trident of Shiva, the most powerful god in the Hindu pantheon, There is a legend that says high in the Himalayas at Gosaikunda, Shiva drove his trident into the ground to create three springs – the source of the river and hence its name Trisuli.

Course
The sources of the Trishuli River lie in the Pekhu Kangri range (called Langtang Himal in Nepal) in the Kyirong County in Tibet. Two major rivers Kyirong Tsangpo (or Kerung Khola) and Lende Khola merge near the Rasuwa Fort at the Nepal border to form the Trishuli river. Kyirong Tsangpo has a large basin extending beyond the town of Dzongka and numerous streams forming it: Zarong chu, Gyang chu, Prongda chu, Ublung chu, Tsalung chu, Ragma chu etc. After Ragma, it passes through a lush green alpine "Kyirong Valley" (elevation 2700 m) with several villages and the Kyirong Town. Afterwards it enters a deep gorge before reaching the Rasuwa Fort. The last stretch of the river is used as part of the Nepal–China border.

Lende Khola has two further tributaries originating in Langtang Himal, viz., Richong Chu and Chusumdo Tsangpo, the latter again forming part of the Nepal–China border.

Even though the Trishuli river is physically formed at the Rasuwa Fort, it is not officially called so at this stage. It is referred to by the generic name of "Bhot Koshi" ("the river from Tibet"). It is called Trishuli Ganga after receiving the Trisuli Khola stream originating in Gosainkunda near Dhunche. This would make Gosainkunda the official source of the river, and the river from Tibet a tributary.

Tributaries Tadi Khola and Likhu Khola join Tishuli near the city of Bidur. The valleys of these rivers provide a link-up to Kathmandu via the pass of Badh Bhangyang. These valleys made up the traditional route between Kathmandu and Tibet.

Procceding further, Trishuli joins the Narayani River  at Devghat. Narayani flows south into India and joins the Ganges.

Basin data
More than 60 per cent of the total drainage basin of the Trishuli lies in Tibet with about 9 per cent being covered by snow and glaciers. 85 per cent of its catchment area of  lies above  out of which 11 per cent lies above . The average lowest and the melt season discharges of this river are close to average discharges recorded on the Narayani River.

Water sports and tourism
Trisuli is Nepal’s most popular rafting river with impressive gorges, exciting rapids, some easier sections and easy accessibility from Kathmandu and Pokhara. Rafting in Trisuli is one of the most popular outdoor activities in Nepal. Trishuli River is made up of snow melt of Mt. Ganesh and Langtang Himal. Chitwan National Park is also easily accessible.

Most of the travel and tour agents in Nepal show off Trishuli River Rafting as one of the most adventurous river rafting activity in Nepal. 

The Trishuli valley also proves to be dangerous to travellers. The curvy Prithvi Highway led to the death of many Nepalese people traveling to or returning from Kathmandu. Every year, several buses and trucks fall and disappear into this wild river.

References

External links
 Trisuli River system, OpenStreetMap, retrieved 8 Januaryr 2023

Rivers of Bagmati Province
Rivers of Tibet
International rivers of Asia